Dubovoye is a rural locality (a settlement) and the administrative center of Dubovskoye Rural Settlement, Belgorodsky District, Belgorod Oblast, Russia. Population:  There are 225 streets.

Geography 
Dubovoye is located 15 km east of Maysky (the district's administrative centre) by road. Tavrovo is the nearest rural locality.

References 

Rural localities in Belgorodsky District